Úrkút is a village in Veszprém county, Hungary.

South of Úrkút, there is the 238 metres tall Kabhegy TV Mast, the fourth tallest radio tower in Hungary.

External links 
 Street map (Hungarian)

Populated places in Veszprém County